Season two of the 2017 edition of El Gran Show premiered on June 10, 2017.

The season was also named as the "First World Dance Championship", because the participating couples represented the countries of origin of the celebrities.

On August 26, 2017, Brenda Carvalho and her professional partner Kevin Ubillus were declared the winners, Lucas Piró and his sister Maru Piró finished second, while Belén Estévez and Waldir Felipa finished third.

Cast

Couples
The first seven celebrities were presented on Wednesday, June 7, 2017, at a press conference. All the presented were former contestants of the show, being Lucas Piró the first professional dancer who returned participating as a celebrity. In the first week were presented the professional dancers, in addition to the entrance of one more celebrity, Alexander Kobzar. In the second week, a new pair entered the show, Cinthya Coppiano and Jimy García. In the Week 8, another pair entered the show, former contestant Thiago Cunha and the eliminated dancer Yamila Molina.

Hosts and judges
Gisela Valcárcel returned as host while Morella Petrozzi, Carlos Cacho and Pachi Valle Riestra returned as judges. During the first three weeks, Michelle Alexander could not be present due to labor reasons, being replaced in the second and third week by the former contestants Santi Lesmes and Tilsa Lozano, respectively. On the fourth week, it was confirmed that Alexander would not return to the program for personal reasons, so Lozano entered as a new judge in her place. On August 5, professional dancer & art director Jimmy Gamonet de los Heros, filling in for Valle Riestra.

Scoring charts

Red numbers indicate the sentenced for each week
Green numbers indicate the best steps for each week
"—" indicates the couple(s) did not dance that week 
 the couple was eliminated that week
 the couple was safe in the duel
  the couple was eliminated that week and safe with a lifeguard
 the winning couple
 the runner-up couple
 the third-place couple

Average score chart
This table only counts dances scored on a 40-point scale.

Highest and lowest scoring performances
The best and worst performances in each dance according to the judges' 40-point scale are as follows:

Couples' highest and lowest scoring dances
Scores are based upon a potential 40-point maximum.

Weekly scores
Individual judges' scores in the charts below (given in parentheses) are listed in this order from left to right: Morella Petrozzi, Carlos Cacho, Tilsa Lozano, Pachi Valle Riestra.

Week 1: Salsa Night
Individual judges' scores in the charts below (given in parentheses) are listed in this order from left to right: Morella Petrozzi, Carlos Cacho, Pachi Valle Riestra.

The couples danced salsa. This week none couples were sentenced.
Running order

Week 2: World dances Individual judges' scores in the charts below (given in parentheses) are listed in this order from left to right: Morella Petrozzi, Carlos Cacho, Santi Lesmes, Pachi Valle Riestra.The couples performed the world dances, except for Cinthya Coppiano and Jimy García, who entered this week and danced salsa for being the style of the past week.

Due to personal issues, Milett Figueroa was not present at the gala, being replaced by the winner of previous season, Diana Sánchez.
Running order

Week 3: Bachata Under the Rain 
The couples (except those sentenced) danced bachata under the rain.
Running order

The duel*
Coto & Yamila: Eliminated (but safe with the lifeguard)
Alexander & Isabel: Safe

Week 4: Cumbia Night 
The couples (except those sentenced) danced cumbia. In the versus, only three couples faced dancing hip-hop, the winner would take two extra points plus the couples who gave their support votes.
Running order

The duel*
Milett & Patricio: Safe
Coto & Yamila: Eliminated 
Alexander & Isabel: Safe

Week 5: Dances in the Sand 
The couples (except those sentenced) performed one unlearned dance in the sand.

Due to an injury, Patricio Quiñones was unable to perform this week, so Milett Figueroa danced with Sergio Álvarez instead.
Running order

The duel*
Milena & George: Safe
Cynthia & Jimy: Eliminated
Milett & Sergio: Safe

Week 6: Trio Salsa 
The couples (except those sentenced) danced a trio salsa involving an eliminated pro or a member of the troupe. In the versus, only three couples faced dancing belly dance, the winner would take two extra points plus the couples who gave their support votes.
Running order

The duel*
Milena & George: Eliminated
Alexander & Isabel: Safe

 Week 7: Merengue Night 
The couples (except those sentenced) danced merengue. In the versus, the couples faced dancing different styles. This week none couples were sentenced.
Running order

The duel*
Milett & Sergio: Eliminated (but safe with the lifeguard)
Alexander & Isabel: Safe

 Week 8: Acrobatic Night Individual judges' scores in the chart below (given in parentheses) are listed in this order from left to right: Morella Petrozzi, Carlos Cacho, Tilsa Lozano, Jimmy Gamonet de los Heros.The couples performed one unlearned dance in which they had to perform different acrobatics. In the versus, only three couples faced dancing jazz, the winner would take two extra points plus the couples who gave their support votes.

Due to personal issue, Waldir Felipa was unable to perform this week, so Belén Estévez danced with Gian Frank Navarro instead.
Running order

 Week 9: Trio Cha-cha-cha 
The couples (except those sentenced) danced trio cha-cha-cha with another celebrity. In the versus, they faced Lucas & Maru against Christian & Isabel (former couple of the show); the winner would take two extra points plus the couples who gave them their support votes.
Running order

The duel*
Thiago & Yamila: Safe
Alexander & Isabel: Eliminated

 Week 10: Semifinals Individual judges' scores in the chart below (given in parentheses) are listed in this order from left to right: Morella Petrozzi, Carlos Cacho, Tilsa Lozano, Pachi Valle Riestra, Guest Judges.The couples performed an unlearned dance designed by themselves and a hero dance, which involved only the celebrities dancing side-by-side to the same song and receiving the same set of scores from the judges for the routine.

For the first time in the history of the show, there were three guest judge, Michelle Alexander, Rebeca Escribens and Yola Polastri, all of them scoring couples on a scale of 1 to 10 in each of the routines.
Running order

The duel*
Thiago & Yamila: Safe
Milett & Sergio: Eliminated

 Week 11: Finals 
In the first part, the couples danced salsa.

In the second part, the four finalist couples danced freestyle.

In the third part, the three finalists couples danced a viennese waltz.
Running order (Part 1)

Running order (Part 2)

Running order (Part 3)

Dance chart
The celebrities and professional partners will dance one of these routines for each corresponding week:
 Week 1: Salsa (Salsa Night)
 Week 2: One unlearned dance (World dances)
 Week 3: Bachata (Bachata Under the Rain)
 Week 4: Cumbia & the versus (Cumbia Night)
 Week 5: One unlearned dance (Dances in the Sand)
 Week 6: Trio salsa & the versus (Trio Salsa)
 Week 7: Merengue & the versus (Merengue Night)
 Week 8: One unlearned dance & the versus (Acrobatic Night)
 Week 9: Trio cha-cha-cha & the versus (Trio Cha-cha-cha)
 Week 10: One unlearned dance & heroes dances (Semifinals)
 Week 11: Salsa, favorite dance & viennese waltz (Finals)

"—" indicates the couple did not dance that week 
 Highest scoring dance
 Lowest scoring dance
 Gained bonus points for winning
 Gained no bonus points for losing
 Danced, but not scored
In Italic'' indicate the dance performed in the duel

Guest judges

Notes

References

External links

El Gran Show
2017 Peruvian television seasons
Reality television articles with incorrect naming style